Tia River , a perennial stream of the Macleay River catchment, is located in the Northern Tablelands district of New South Wales, Australia.

Course and features
The river rises below Mount Grundy on the eastern slopes of the Great Dividing Range southwest of Tia, and flows generally northeast before reaching its confluence with the Apsley River, northwest of Tia. The river descends  over its  course; spilling over the Tia Falls in the Oxley Wild Rivers National Park.

The river is transversed by the Oxley Highway.

Previously the river was known as Crimps Creek and also Crokers River which John Oxley had named this stream, in honour of the First Secretary of the Admiralty.

The country above the Tia Falls is a rich grazing area used for rearing livestock. The upper parts of the Tia River have remarkable cool temperate rainforests, with unusual species such as Southern Sassafras, White Mountain Banksia and Black Olive Berry.

Tia River is a general trout stream.

Gallery

See also

 List of rivers of Australia
 Rivers of New South Wales

References

External links
 

Rivers of New South Wales
Northern Tablelands